Silvia Rubio Ávila (born 12 October 2000) is a Spanish footballer who plays as a midfielder for Madrid CFF.

Club career
Rubio started her career at Madrid CFF.

References

External links
Profile at La Liga

2000 births
Living people
Women's association football midfielders
Spanish women's footballers
Footballers from Madrid
Madrid CFF players
Primera División (women) players
Spain women's youth international footballers
Expatriate women's footballers in Italy
Spanish expatriate sportspeople in Italy
Spanish expatriate women's footballers
A.C. Milan Women players
Serie A (women's football) players